The following is a list of recurring Saturday Night Live characters and sketches introduced between November 9, 1985, and May 24, 1986, the eleventh season of SNL.

Cabrini Green Jackson
A Danitra Vance sketch. Debuted November 9, 1985.

Appearances

The Jones Brothers
A Damon Wayans and Anthony Michael Hall sketch. Debuted November 9, 1985.

The Limits of the Imagination
The Limits of the Imagination was a short-lived sketch featured on the 1985–1986 season. It featured Randy Quaid as "The Floating Head", a Rod Serling-like character who would introduce a creepy, Twilight Zone-esque story with a weak ending (or no ending at all). The title was also reminiscent of the 1960s sci-fi anthology The Outer Limits.

Appearances

The Pat Stevens Show
Nora Dunn played the host, a somewhat dim, shallow, ex-model who thought Vogue was literature. Debuted November 16, 1985.

Appearances

Craig Sundberg, Idiot Savant
An Anthony Michael Hall sketch. Debuted November 16, 1985.

Tommy Flanagan, the Pathological Liar
The Pathological Liar is a character created and portrayed by Jon Lovitz, often appearing on Weekend Update segments to share his farcical views. The character's name was Tommy Flanagan — not to be confused with the jazz pianist) — and he would tell outrageous whoppers in an effort to make himself seem important (such as his claim that he invented rock and roll). One recurring lie was claiming he was married to Morgan Fairchild, and thus had seen her naked, "more than once."  His devious look, hand rubbing and nervous speech made it clear he was making up lies, one after the other, on the spot.  After a particularly outrageous lie he would often use an old Humphrey Bogart line, "Yeah! That's the ticket!", as a catchphrase.

One of his biggest lies, however, would work to his great advantage. During the cold opening when Jerry Hall hosted, Flanagan claimed to be an old friend of her then-boyfriend Mick Jagger; when Jagger entered moments later, he shocked her by revealing that the two were longtime friends, and had actually spent the previous weekend together, while she had no idea of his whereabouts, on a fishing trip.  As he and Hall got up to leave, Jagger told Flanagan, "I owe you for this one," before opening the show.

Appearances

Master Thespian
Jon Lovitz plays a ruthlessly ambitious, egomaniacal actor who spoke with a plummy "Shakespearean" English accent and often elicited the sympathy of other characters in the sketch, only to reveal the ruse by declaring his catchphrase, "Acting!" His arch-rival and mentor, Baudelaire (John Lithgow), often had the last laugh in the escalating one-upmanship, in reality childish pranks and paperthin disguises that they both fell for, ostensibly due to their brilliant acting. On the few occasions we actually see him act, it is clear that he is not as good as his reputation would have us believe, on occasion seeming completely oblivious to the concept of acting. The sketch debuted December 7, 1985 and appeared 13 times between 1985 and 1989.

In 2016, Lovitz stated that the character was based on Canadian actor William Needles, who was his drama professor at the University of California at Irvine.  The character was meant as a tribute, not a put-down:  "He was the kindest, nicest man. A great actor," Lovitz tweeted. "I based (the) character Master Thespian a lot on him. He was the nicest teacher, ever."

Appearances

The Rudy Randolphs
A Randy Quaid and Robert Downey, Jr. sketch. Debuted December 7, 1985.

Appearances

The Stand-Ups
An ensemble sketch; Jon Lovitz appeared in all three "Stand-Ups" sketches, while Tom Hanks, Damon Wayans and Dennis Miller each appeared in two of the three. Several stand-up comedians talk backstage, drinking coffee before their set.  Their patter is always delivered in an exaggerated stand-up style:  "Hey!  What's with half-and-half? If it's half-empty, is it quarter-quarter?  I wanna know!"  Debuted December 14, 1985.

Appearances

Tom Hanks reprised his Paul character from this sketch in a Cut For Time "Bruce Chandling" Weekend Update feature on October 22, 2016 (Season 42, Episode 4).

That Black Girl
A Danitra Vance sketch. Debuted January 18, 1986.

Vinnie Barber
A Jon Lovitz sketch. Debuted January 18, 1986.

Mephistopheles
A Jon Lovitz sketch. Debuted January 25, 1986.

Appearances

The Big Picture
A Weekend Update commentary segment with A. Whitney Brown.
Appearances

Babette
A Nora Dunn sketch. Debuted February 15, 1986.

Appearances

The Further Adventures of Biff and Salena
The various mundane events in the lives of a seemingly mentally disabled couple (Jon Lovitz and Joan Cusack). Debuted February 22, 1986.

Actors of Film
A Nora Dunn and Robert Downey Jr sketch. Debuted March 22, 1986.

Appearances

References

Lists of recurring Saturday Night Live characters and sketches
Saturday Night Live
Saturday Night Live
Saturday Night Live in the 1980s